Quarters One (also known as Building 301) is the former residence of the highest-ranking officer at Rock Island Arsenal in Rock Island, Illinois on the banks of the Mississippi River.

History 

Work begun on Quarters One under General Thomas S. Rodman in May 1870 and was completed in 1872 under Major Flagler.  The home was built for the purpose of providing quarters for the highest-ranking officer as well as providing space for official gatherings and functions. The building was designed in the Italianate style.  The first major gathering held in the residence was in 1871 for the funeral of General Rodman.  Over the years, many dignitaries and notable personalities stayed at the residence including Charles Lindbergh in 1927 and King Carl XVI Gustav and Queen Silvia of Sweden in 1996. In 2006, the Army decided to discontinue its use as a residence.  The last occupants, Maj. Gen and Mrs. Robert M. Radin, left in 2008. Tours are offered occasionally, and the Army is currently exploring other uses for the building.  In 2011, it was estimated that at least $6 million in work was needed.

References

External links 

 

National Historic Landmarks in Illinois
National Register of Historic Places in Rock Island County, Illinois
Houses on the National Register of Historic Places in Illinois